Alexis Loret (born 10 January 1975) is a French film and television actor.

Devoting himself initially to cabinetmaking, he became a model, and was noticed by André Téchiné.

Selected filmography
Alice et Martin (Alice and Martin) (1998)
Le Jour de grâce (short, 2000)
Sans plomb (Unleaded) (2000)
Gamer (2001)
Toutes les nuits (2001)
Les Visiteurs en Amérique (2001)
Backstage (short, 2001)
Le Nom du feu (short, 2002)
Brocéliande (2002)
Le Monde vivant (The Living World) (2003)
Le Soleil assassiné (2003)
Mariages! (2004)
Marseille (2004)
Le Pont des Arts (2004)
UV (2007)
L'Année suivante (2007)
Impardonnables (Unforgivable) (2011)
Qui vive (Insecure) (2014)
Mon Amie Victoria (2014)
En équilibre (2015)
Quand on a 17 ans (Being 17) (2016)
Transferts (2017)

Television
Sartre, l'âge des passions (2006)
SoeurThérèse.com (1 episode, 2006)
Mademoiselle Gigi (2004)
Pierre et Jean (2004)
Nestor Burma (1 episode, 2002)
L' Algérie des chimères (2001)
Les Déracinés (2001)
Louis la brocante (1 episode, 1999)
La philo selon Philippe (5 episodes, 1995–1996)

External links
 

1975 births
Living people
French male film actors
French male television actors
20th-century French male actors
21st-century French male actors
People from Saint-Lô